Frederick Walter Collard (6 June 1912 – 1 December 1986) was an Australian politician. Born in Beverley, Western Australia, he was educated at state schools before becoming a goldminer and an official with the Australian Workers' Union. He served in the military 1942–1946. In 1961, he was elected to the Australian House of Representatives as the Labor member for Kalgoorlie, defeating one-term Liberal member Peter Browne. He held the seat until his defeat in 1975. Collard died in 1986.

References

Australian Labor Party members of the Parliament of Australia
Members of the Australian House of Representatives for Kalgoorlie
Members of the Australian House of Representatives
1912 births
1986 deaths
People from Beverley, Western Australia
Australian miners
Australian trade unionists
20th-century Australian politicians